The Intruder is a 2020 Argentine psychological thriller film directed by Natalia Meta. The film is loosely based on the novel El mal menor by C. E. Feiling. It was selected to compete for the Golden Bear in the main competition section at the 70th Berlin International Film Festival. It was selected as the Argentine entry for the Best International Feature Film at the 94th Academy Awards.

Plot
A voice actress faces an identity crisis, convinced her body is being overtaken by intruders from her dreams.

Cast
 Cecilia Roth as Marta
 Nahuel Pérez Biscayart as Alberto
 Erica Rivas as Inés
 Daniel Hendler as Leopoldo
 Guillermo Arengo as Maestro

See also
 List of submissions to the 94th Academy Awards for Best International Feature Film
 List of Argentine submissions for the Academy Award for Best International Feature Film

References

External links
 

2020 films
2020 thriller films
2020s Spanish-language films
Argentine psychological thriller films
2020s Argentine films

2020 psychological thriller films
Argentine thriller drama films